Archana Jois (born 24 December 1994) is an Indian actress who appears in Kannada films. Jois is known for her role as Shanthamma, Rocky's mother in K.G.F film series.

Career 
She is one of the few Indian actresses to take up mother roles at a young age. Her dialogue in the first film, which translated to "If you gain courage because a thousand people are standing behind you, then you can only win a war. But if a thousand people get courage because you are standing in front of them, you can conquer the world" became popular.  She started her career with playing lead roles in television soaps Durga and Mahadevi. Jois played the second female lead in films such as Vijayaratha and the Marathi film Rajkumar.

She is set to play the main lead in Hondisi Bareyiri and #Mute. She will play a role in Nakshe. She was a part of the film Kalankata, which is yet to release. She is a trained Bharatanatyam dancer.

Filmography

Television

References

External links 

20th-century Indian actresses
21st-century Indian actresses
Actresses from Bengaluru
Actresses in Kannada cinema
Indian film actresses
Living people
1994 births